A Hickson Compact Group (abbreviation: HCG) is a collection of galaxies designated as published by Paul Hickson in 1982.

The most famous group on Hickson's list of 100 objects is HCG 92, Stephan's Quintet.

Hickson Compact Groups
According to Hickson: “Most compact groups contain a high fraction of galaxies having morphological or kinematical peculiarities, nuclear radio and infrared emission, and starburst or active galactic nuclei (AGN) activity. They contain large quantities of diffuse gas and are dynamically dominated by dark matter. They most likely form as subsystems within looser associations and evolve by gravitational processes. Strong galaxy interactions result and merging is expected to lead to the ultimate demise of the group. Compact groups are surprisingly numerous, and may play a significant role in galaxy evolution.”

List

Gallery

See also

 Abell catalogue
 Catalogue of Galaxies and Clusters of Galaxies

References

Further reading

External links

Astronomy Picture of the Day – Galaxy Group Hickson 31 – 22 February 2010

 
Astronomical catalogues of galaxy clusters